Management is a 2008 American romantic comedy-drama directed by Stephen Belber and starring Jennifer Aniston and Steve Zahn. It premiered at the 2008 Toronto International Film Festival and received a limited theatrical release on May 15, 2009.

Plot
Mike Flux (Steve Zahn) works at his parents' motel as the night manager. One day he sees Sue (Jennifer Aniston), who is staying at the motel for the weekend. He develops a crush on her and surprises her at her door with a bottle of wine. She doesn't quite know what to make of his approach, shares some wine to be polite, then asks him to leave. He returns the next day, trying the same trick with champagne, and this time she allows him to touch her butt momentarily. As she heads back home the next day she decides to go back and have sex with Mike in the laundry room.

Mike realizes his feelings for Sue and flies to her home in Baltimore. She's shocked to see him there, but out of courtesy allows him to stay with her until morning when he can go back home. After spending some time together they get to know each other better as friends, and soon after Mike returns home, Sue stays at the motel again. They decide to go out and have fun. Mike's mother (Margo Martindale) is very sick, and the two stop by her home to see her. She approves of Sue, and tells Mike that he needs to find happiness in his life. Soon after Sue leaves, Mike's mother passes away. Mike decides to make a change in his life and go after Sue once again.

Mike learns that Sue has gotten back together with her old boyfriend, Jango (Woody Harrelson), a former punk rocker turned successful businessman in Aberdeen, WA. Mike settles into the new town by taking a job at a Chinese restaurant. The son of the owners, Al (James Hiroyuki Liao), befriends him and allows Mike to stay in the restaurant's basement. Mike skydives into Sue and Jango's pool to surprise her, but Jango responds by attacking him with an airsoft gun. Feeling bad about what he did, Jango invites Mike and Al over for dinner. Jango knows Mike has feelings towards Sue and threatens him. Regardless of the threat, Mike, with help from Al, sings a song for Sue outside her window later that night. Sue meets up with Mike the next day, informing him, that she and Jango are getting married. Sue is pregnant, and she wants to be with someone that's in control of his life. In anger after everything he worked for to be with her, Mike tells Sue to leave.

After spending four months in a Buddhist monastery, Mike returns to the motel, now being run solely by his father (Fred Ward). After talking about moving on with their lives, Mike's father hands him the deed to the motel. Mike decides to turn the motel into a homeless shelter, something Sue had mentioned always wanting to do. Mike calls her at home to tell her, but Jango answers the phone. He reveals that Sue has left him and is living with her mother. Mike makes his way to Sue's home to ask her for help with the shelter. She's happy to see him and tells him that she had messed up their relationship. Mike tells her he loves her and only wants to take care of her and her baby. The story ends as they embrace.

Cast

 Jennifer Aniston as Sue Claussen
 Steve Zahn as Mike Flux
 Woody Harrelson as Jango
 Fred Ward as Jerry Flux
 Margo Martindale as Trish Flux
 James Hiroyuki Liao as Al
 Josh Lucas as Barry

Filming
While set in Kingman, Arizona, Maryland, and Washington, filming took place entirely in Oregon in 2007. Sonny’s Motel in Madras served as the Kingman Motor Inn, while Portland stepped in for Baltimore. Instead of Aberdeen, Washington, both Oregon City and West Linn were used to represent the hometown of Kurt Cobain. Even the footage showing Zahn's character driving cross-country from Arizona to Maryland was all shot in Oregon.

Reception
Management received mixed reviews from critics. On Rotten Tomatoes the film has an approval rating of 47% based on reviews from 96 critics. The website's critical consensus concludes: 
"Clever and often beguiling performances by Steve Zahn and Jennifer Aniston can't revive this sweetly misguided stalker romance." On Metacritic it has a score of 50/100 base on reviews from 26 critics.

Home media
The DVD was released on September 29, 2009. It has grossed $3,820,537 in US DVD sales.

References

External links
 
 

2008 films
2008 romantic comedy-drama films
American romantic comedy-drama films
Films produced by Jennifer Aniston
Films set in Baltimore
Films set in Washington (state)
Films shot in Portland, Oregon
Films shot in Washington (state)
Temple Hill Entertainment films
Sidney Kimmel Entertainment films
Echo Films films
Films set in Arizona
Films scored by Mychael Danna
Films scored by Rob Simonsen
Films produced by Wyck Godfrey
2000s English-language films
2000s American films